The Powers Street Mosque in Brooklyn, New York City is one of the oldest mosques in the United States. It was founded by a small group of Lipka Tatars, originating from the Białystok region of Poland. This was the first Muslim organization in New York State and the first official mosque for New York City's Muslim population.

History

Beginnings
Small-scale Muslim immigration to the United States began in 1840, with the arrival of Yemenis and Turks, and lasted until World War I. Most of the immigrants, from Arab areas of the Ottoman Empire, came with the purpose of making money and returning to their homeland. Some of these immigrants settled in the United States permanently. Nonetheless, the population of Muslims in the United States was small in the first half of the 20th century, and many of these first immigrants assimilated and did not create any lasting Muslim religious institutions.

Lipka Tatars have been a fixture of Poland's ethnic landscape since the 14th century, with many gaining the privileges of nobility in the Polish–Lithuanian Commonwealth. Lipka Tatars settlements were located in northeast Poland, Belarus, Lithuania, south-east Latvia and Ukraine, with about 10,000 to 15,000 Lipka Tatars still living in Poland, Belarus, and Lithuania. Lipka Tatars in these communities followed their Polish neighbors in immigrating to the United States, and subsequently settled close to the Polish enclave of Greenpoint, Brooklyn. This community formally organized themselves as the American Mohammedan Society in 1907.

104 Powers Street
When the American Mohammedan Society bought 104 Powers Street in 1931 along with two adjacent lots, the organization became the first corporate body to purchase land in New York City with the express purpose of practicing Islam. An article in a 1935 issue of The Muslim World Journal describes 104 Powers Street as a three-story wooden building that is the “only real mosque which exists today in America." Time Magazine wrote about the mosque in a feature on Ramadan in its November 15th issue in 1937: 

The American Mohammedan Society is the fifth owner of the property, which has served as a church, a District Assembly Clubhouse for the Democratic Party, as well as a greenhouse. The structure was originally constructed as the Powers Street Methodist Episcopal Church, and the interior still resembles a Christian worship space today, with three short steps leading up to an altar on the first floor that the Tatars converted into a minbar. Congregants stand diagonally to pray and a makeshift partition separates the women’s prayer area from the men’s section; unlike conventional mosques that face the Kaaba in Mecca, 104 Powers Street is not a purpose-built mosque.

Present
The Lipka Tatar community in Brooklyn has shrunk dramatically since then. These days, the mosque usually only opens up for weddings and funerals, presided over by a part-time Imam of Bulgarian descent who lives in Long Island.

References

External links
 Islamicana.com: New York’s First Mosque?
 Nothing new about mosques in New York
 The Baltic Times: How America's oldest mosque was built by Muslims from the Baltic
 BBC: The amazing survival of the Baltic Muslims

Belarusian-American culture in New York City
Lipka Tatars
Lithuanian-American culture in New York City
Mosques in New York City
Polish-American culture in New York City
Williamsburg, Brooklyn